Glaucoclystis satoi  is a moth in the family Geometridae. It is found in northeast India, northern Vietnam, Taiwan, and the Japanese island Amami Ōshima.

Further reading
 List of moths of Japan (Bombycoidea-Geometroidea)

References

Moths described in 2002
Eupitheciini
Moths of Japan
Moths of Taiwan
Taxa named by Hiroshi Inoue